Lehte Hainsalu (married name Lehte Sööt; born 31 October 1938, Haaslava Parish, Tartu County) is an Estonian writer, poet and politician.

In 1961 she graduated from Tartu State University, studied Estonian philology. After graduation, she worked at the newspaper Edasi, at the Tartu Widget Factory, and at Eesti Televisioon studios in Tartu.

From 1981 to 1990, she was the head of Tartu division of Estonian Writers' Union.

In 1980, she signed in Letter of 40 intellectuals.

She has won many awards, e.g. Friedebert Tuglas short story award (1987), the Karl Eduard Sööt Prize for Children's Poetry (1992, 2015).

Works
 1957: poetry collection "Sõnajala õis"
 1967: novel "Pigilinnu laul"
 1980: poetry collection "Ainsa ööga läbi maa"
 2003: poetry collection "Lapsed lennand tuulde"
 2011: novel "Vastamata kõne"

References

1938 births
Living people
20th-century Estonian women writers
21st-century Estonian women writers
Estonian children's writers
Estonian women children's writers
Estonian women novelists
20th-century Estonian novelists
21st-century Estonian novelists
Estonian women poets
20th-century Estonian poets
21st-century Estonian poets
Estonian politicians
Miina Härma Gymnasium alumni
University of Tartu alumni
Recipients of the Order of the National Coat of Arms, 3rd Class
Recipients of the Order of the National Coat of Arms, 4th Class
Recipients of the Order of the White Star, 5th Class

People from Kastre Parish